The United Nations Permanent Forum on Indigenous Issues (UNPFII or PFII) is the UN's central coordinating body for matters relating to the concerns and rights of the world's indigenous peoples. There are more than 370 million indigenous people (also known as native, original, aboriginal and first peoples) in some 70 countries worldwide.

The forum was created in 2000 as an outcome of the UN's International Year for the World's Indigenous People in 1993, within the first International Decade of the World's Indigenous People (1995–2004). It is an advisory body within the framework of the United Nations System that reports to the UN's Economic and Social Council (ECOSOC).

History 
Resolution 45/164 of the United Nations General Assembly was adopted on 18 December 1990, proclaiming that 1993 would be the International Year for the World's Indigenous People, "with a view to strengthening international cooperation for the solution of problems faced by indigenous communities in areas such as human rights, the environment, development, education and health". The year was launched in Australia by Prime Minister Paul Keating's memorable Redfern speech on 10 December 1992, in which he addressed Indigenous Australians' disadvantage.

The creation of the permanent forum was discussed at the 1993 World Conference on Human Rights in Vienna, Austria. The Vienna Declaration and Programme of Action recommended that such a forum should be established within the first United Nations International Decade of the World's Indigenous Peoples.

A working group was formed and various other meetings took place that led to the establishment of the permanent forum by Economic and Social Council Resolution 2000/22 on 28 July 2000.

Functions and operation
It submits recommendations to the Council on issues related to indigenous peoples. It holds a two-week session each year which takes place at the United Nations Headquarters in New York City but it could also take place in Geneva or any other place as decided by the forum.

Mandate 
The mandate of the Forum is to discuss indigenous issues related to economic and social development, culture, the environment, education, health and human rights. The forum is to:

 Provide expert advice and recommendations to the Economic and Social Council and to the various programmes, funds and agencies of the United Nations System through the Council;
 Raise awareness and promote the integration and coordination of activities related to indigenous issues within the UN system;
 Prepare and disseminate information on these issues.

Members
The forum is composed of 16 independent experts, functioning in their personal capacity, who are appointed to three-year terms. At the end of their term, they can be re-elected or re-appointed for one additional term.

Of these 16 members, eight are nominated by the member governments and eight directly nominated by indigenous organizations. Those nominated by the governments are then elected to office by the Economic and Social Council based on the five regional groupings of the United Nations. Whereas those nominated by indigenous organisations are appointed by the President of the Economic and Social Council and represent the seven socio-cultural regions for broad representation of the world's indigenous peoples.

Members of the Permanent Forum, January 2020 to December 2022

Sessions 
To date, eighteen sessions have been held, all at UN Headquarters, New York:

Secretariat 
The Secretariat of the PFII was established by the General Assembly in 2002 with Resolution 57/191. It is based in the New York within the Division for Inclusive Social Development (DISD) of the United Nations Department of Economic and Social Affairs (DESA). The Secretariat, among other things, prepares the annual sessions of the Forum, provides support and assistance to the Forum's members, promotes awareness of indigenous issues within the UN system, governments and the public, and serves as a source of information and a coordination point for indigenous-related efforts.

International Decade of the World's Indigenous People

First Decade 
The first International Decade of the World's Indigenous People, "Indigenous People: Partnership in Action" (1995–2004), was proclaimed by General Assembly resolution 48/163 with the main objective of strengthening international cooperation for the solution of problems faced by indigenous peoples in areas such as human rights, environment, development, health and education.

Second Decade 
The Second International Decade of the World's Indigenous People, "Partnership for Action and Dignity" (2005–2015), was proclaimed by the General Assembly at its 59th session, and the programme of action was adopted at the 60th session.

Its objectives are:
 Promoting non-discrimination and inclusion
 Full and effective participation in decision-making
 Re-define development policy from a vision of social equality
 Adopt targeted policies with emphasis on special groups (women, children and youth)
 Develop strong monitoring mechanisms and enhance accountability at all levels to protect the rights of indigenous peoples.

Decade of Indigenous Languages (2022–2032) 
On 28 February 2020, 500 participants of a high-level assembly adopted the "Los Pinos Declaration" which concentrates on the indigenous language users' human rights.

Regional groupings 
To ensure diversity, members are elected from different regions depending on who nominated them:

 The United Nations Regional Groups are used for the eight members nominated by governments and elected by the Economic and Social Council:
African Group
Asia-Pacific Group
Eastern Europe Group
Latin America and the Caribbean Group
Western Europe and Other States Group
 The seven socio-cultural regions are used for the eight nominated by indigenous organisations and appointed by the President of the Economic and Social Council:
 Africa
 Asia
 Central and South America and the Caribbean
 The Arctic
 Central and Eastern Europe, Russian Federation, Central Asia and Transcaucasia
 North America
 The Pacific
Note: Of the eight members nominated by indigenous organizations one must come from each of the seven regions, with  one additional rotating seat among the first three first listed above.

See also 

 Declaration on the Rights of Indigenous Peoples
 Indigenous Peoples Climate Change Assessment Initiative
 International Day of the World's Indigenous Peoples

References

Further reading
Partnering with Indigenous Peoples: Experiences and Practices
 Statements during the 2006 Permanent Forum on Indigenous Issues
 History of the United Nations Permanent Forum on Indigenous Issues (2006)
 State of The World's Indigenous Peoples - UN report, First Issue, 2009
 Inter-Agency Support Group on Indigenous Issues (IASG) (2006)
  Awareness raising film by Rebecca Sommer for the Secretariat of the UNPFII, 2006

External links 
 

Indigenous peoples
United Nations Secretariat
United Nations Economic and Social Council
2000 establishments in New York City
Articles containing video clips